Kenya is a given name. It is considered to be an African-American name in the United States. Notable people with the name include:

Kenya Barris (born 1974), American writer
Kenya Bell (born 1977), American singer
Kenya Hathaway, American singer
Kenya Moore (born 1971), American actress
Kenya Mori (born 1976), Mexican actress
Kenya (Robinson) (born 1977), American artist
Kenya D. Williamson, American writer

References